Henri Leroy (12 December 1887 – 17 July 1960) was a Belgian footballer. He played in 18 matches for the Belgium national football team from 1908 to 1919.

References

External links
 

1887 births
1960 deaths
Belgian footballers
Belgium international footballers
Place of birth missing
Association football goalkeepers